Ohana by Hawaiian was a regional subsidiary carrier of Hawaiian Airlines. The service was operated using four ATR 42 turboprop airplanes owned by Hawaiian and operated under contract by Empire Airlines. The new service was slated to begin in summer 2013 initially flying to Moloka'i and Lana'i; however, the airline was unable to begin operations during that period because of Federal Aviation Administration delays in certifying Ohana's operation. During its time of operation, Ohana by Hawaiian was fully integrated into the Hawaiian Airlines network.

On May 27, 2021, Hawaiian announced that 'Ohana by Hawaiian would be discontinued after the COVID-19 pandemic forced the shuttering of the carrier's operations. All of its fleet will be sold and existing employees working under Hawaiian will be reassigned elsewhere.

History
In February 2014, Hawaiian announced that Ohana would begin service on March 11. On June 12, 2014, Ohana by Hawaiian announced it would expand its route network to Maui offering daily flights between Kahului, Maui and Moloka'i; Kahului and Kona, Hawai'i Island; and Kahului and Hilo.

In July 2015, Hawaiian announced that Empire Airlines would begin all cargo freighter service on interisland routes in Hawaii with ATR 72 turboprop aircraft as part of the Ohana by Hawaiian service. Freighter operation began in March 2018 after the acquisition of ATR 72-200(F) aircraft.

During the COVID-19 pandemic, Ohana began reducing its operations. On March 25, 2020, Ohana suspended service to and from Kapalua as a part of its first round of interisland schedule reductions. Beginning November 1, 2020, Ohana paused passenger service to Lanai and Molokai and all interisland cargo service, citing a clause in their contracts with Hawaiian pilots that stated Ohana flights could not be operated if interisland flights operated by Hawaiian's Boeing 717 and Airbus A321 aircraft were significantly reduced as well. Passenger service to Lanai and Molokai was eventually discontinued on January 14, 2021, effectively suspending the carrier's operations. 

On May 27, 2021, Hawaiian announced that it would discontinue the Ohana brand and service after the pandemic and resulting quarantine significantly impacted interisland travel. The interruptions in service forced the airline to reconsider the viability of operation and determine it was no longer feasible. The carrier's ATR fleet would be moved to the mainland and be prepared for sale.

Former destinations

Ohana by Hawaiian served the following destinations:

Cargo flights were flown between Honolulu and Hilo, Kahului, Kona, and Lihue.

Former fleet

See also
 List of airlines of Hawaii

References

External links

Defunct airlines of the United States
Airlines established in 2013
Airlines disestablished in 2021
Defunct regional airlines of the United States
Defunct regional airline brands
2013 establishments in Hawaii
2021 disestablishments in Hawaii
American companies established in 2013
American companies disestablished in 2021
Companies based in Honolulu
Defunct companies based in Hawaii